Four in One (subtitled A Tribute to Thelonious Monk) is the debut album by the group Sphere featuring  pianist Kenny Barron, bassist Buster Williams, and Monk's former drummer Ben Riley, and his former saxophonist Charlie Rouse. The album was released by the Elektra/Musician label. Four in One was coincidentally recorded on the day of Monk's death in 1982, though the musicians were unaware of Monk's death during the recording session and had not planned the album as a memorial tribute.

Reception 

In his review on AllMusic, Ron Wynn states: "Tremendous tribute effort, outstanding versions of Monk classics. Top-flight Monk repertory effort."

Track listing 
All compositions by Thelonious Monk.
 "Four in One" – 6:54
 "Light Blue" – 3:38
 "Monk's Dream" – 6:01
 "Evidence" – 6:01
 "Reflections" – 5:58
 "Eronel" – 6:53

Personnel 
Charlie Rouse – tenor saxophone
Kenny Barron – piano
Buster Williams – bass
Ben Riley – drum

References 

Sphere (American band) albums
1982 albums
Elektra/Musician albums
Thelonious Monk tribute albums
Albums recorded at Van Gelder Studio